Bath County may refer to:

 Bath County, Kentucky, United States
 Bath County, Virginia, United States
 Bath County, North Carolina, United States, an extinct county